Bulder is a surname. Notable people with the surname include:

Evert Bulder (1894–1973), Dutch footballer
Jaap Bulder (1896–1979), Dutch footballer